Board of Education of Oklahoma City v. Dowell, 498 U.S. 237 (1991), was a United States Supreme Court case "hasten[ing] the end of federal court desegregation orders." The Court held that a federal desegregation order should be ended even though it meant that schools would become re-segregated since the Oklahoma schools had been arranged into a unitary system.

See also 
 National Gay Task Force v. Board of Education: An employment law case for the Oklahoma City schools

References

External links 
 

United States Supreme Court cases
United States Supreme Court cases of the Rehnquist Court
United States school desegregation case law
1991 in United States case law
Education in Oklahoma City
Segregation
United States equal protection case law